Malek Jamshid (Persian: ملک جمشید, "King Jamshid") is the twelfth studio album by Iranian singer-songwriter and guitarist Kourosh Yaghmaei. The album was released on June 10, 2016 by Now-Again Records in the United States after it was banned in Iran. The title refers to the legendary king Jamshid from the Shahnameh.

Recording and released
The album was recorded between 2003 and 2006. Because of restrictions on his music in the Islamic Republic, Yaghmaei was forced to record the album in an ordinary room in his apartment without professional equipment. Disputes with the Ministry of Culture and Islamic Guidance to obtain the required permit for releasing the album failed. Malek Jamshid was finally released in 2016 outside Iran by Now-Again Records, a Los Angeles based record label.

Music and lyrics
Malek Jamshid starts with the opining track titled "Key To Miaei" ("When Do You Come?"), that sounds like the title theme to some imaginary late 1990s American sitcom, Seinfeld-ian digital slap bass and heavy-handed rock guitars. The song "Ghatar" ("Train"), is a combination of Latin rhythm what makes the way for dramatic keyboards and Persian lyrics—like a Persian take on Carlos Santana and Rob Thomas's 1999 hit "Smooth."

Track listing

References

External links
 

2016 albums
Kourosh Yaghmaei albums
Albums produced by Kourosh Yaghmaei
Now-Again Records albums
Persian-language albums